Glyndon may refer to several locations in the United States:

 Glyndon, Minnesota in Clay County
 Glyndon Township, Clay County, Minnesota
 Glyndon, Maryland, near Reisterstown
 Glyndon, London, a place in the Royal Borough of Greenwich, southeast London, United Kingdom, in the Plumstead area.